Guy Deutscher (born 1969 in Tel Aviv) is an Israeli linguist.

He is an Honorary Research Fellow at the University of Manchester and was a professor in the Department of Languages and Cultures of Ancient Mesopotamia at the University of Leiden in the Netherlands. He received an undergraduate degree in mathematics at University of Cambridge, before going on to earn a Ph.D in linguistics there. After that he undertook research in Historical Linguistics at St John's College, Cambridge.

Deutscher is the father of Alma Deutscher, a child prodigy composer and musician.

Awards and honours
2011 Royal Society Prizes for Science Books, shortlist, Through the Language Glass

Selected works

Books

Edited by

References

Further reading
American Scientist: An interview with Guy Deutscher (Web Archive copy)
Interview with Guy Deutscher on the evolution of language
Does Your Language Shape How You Think? a NYT Magazine article by Guy Deutscher adapted from his book Through the Language Glass
Standing on the Shoulders of Clichés a lighthearted piece about clichés and their contribution to the world

1969 births
Living people
Alumni of St John's College, Cambridge
Israeli expatriates in the United Kingdom
Israeli Jews
Linguists from Israel
Academic staff of Leiden University
People from Tel Aviv